August Franz Frank (5 April 189821 March 1984) was a German SS functionary in the SS Main Economic and Administrative Office, generally known by its German initials WVHA. The WVHA was, among other things, responsible for the administration of the Nazi concentration camps. After the war, the higher WVHA officials, including Frank, were tried and convicted of crimes against humanity.

Early Nazi career
Frank joined the SS as a private on 1 May 1932, and the Nazi Party on 1 January 1933.  From 1933 to 1935, Frank worked at minor administrative duties in connection with a number of small industries at the Dachau concentration camp manned by inmate labor, most of which were concerned with concentration camp maintenance.

Rise in Nazi hierarchy
In 1935, at the request of Oswald Pohl, Frank became SS Administrative Officer of the Special Purpose Troops (SS-Verfügungstruppe) and of the concentration camp guards, the SS Death's Head units (SS-Totenkopfverbände), although the presence of a bureaucratic rival somewhat limited his authority in the second capacity.  In February 1940, Frank became chief supply officer of the Waffen SS and Death's Head units under Pohl.

Concentration camp administrator
When the WVHA was organized in 1942, he became Pohl's deputy chief of WVHA and chief of Department (Amtsgruppe) A, the administrative division of WVHA. He served in this capacity until 1 September 1943, when he was permitted to resign to become administrative chief of the Order Police. Amtsgruppe A was the administrative branch of WVHA. It comprised five offices (Ämter), as follows:
 Amt A-1: budgets.
 Amt A-2: finance and payroll.
 Amt A-3: legal matters.
 Amt A-4: auditing office.
 Amt A-5: personnel.

Involvement in the Holocaust

A measure of the detailed planning that Frank and other Nazis put into the carrying out of the Holocaust and the deprivation of the property of the murdered Jews can be gauged from a memorandum prepared by Frank on 26 September 1942. For example, Frank gave instructions on dealing with the underwear of the murder victims.  This memorandum, when it came to light after the war, played a key role in refuting Frank's claims that he had no knowledge that Jews were being murdered en masse in the extermination camps of Operation Reinhard. The memorandum is also notable as an example of the use of the Nazi euphemism "evacuation" of the Jews, which meant their systematic murder.

Crimes against humanity
After World War II, Frank was placed on trial on accusations that during his work at WVHA he had committed crimes against humanity.  The court concerned itself with Frank's conduct between 1 September 1939, and 1 September 1943. 
Frank's defense was that he thought the only people in concentration camps were solely composed of German nationals who were either habitual criminals or genuine threats to the Nazi regime.  This argument was rejected by the court, which found that Frank knew of and actively participated in the Nazi slave labor program. 

The court held that the following evidence, among other things, showed Frank's knowledge of the international slave labor program that the Nazi concentration camps had become:
 A letter from Oswald Pohl, dated 26 June 1942, to all Amtsgruppen chiefs (which would have included Frank), stating that the head of every branch office which was provided with prisoners or prisoners of war for work was responsible for the prevention of escape, robbery, and sabotage;
 A letter signed by Oswald Pohl, but actually dictated by Frank, to Heinrich Himmler, which discussed the commanders of many of the concentration camps and their qualifications and recommendations for reassignments, detachments, and promotions.
 Frank's memorandum of 26 September 1942 to SS administrators at Lublin and Auschwitz directing that the Jewish Star be removed from the garments of deceased inmates.

Frank appears to have planned to personally profit from concentration camp labor.  He was an incorporating partner with Georg Lörner, another WVHA official, in a leather and textile enterprise at Dachau.   Based on this and other evidence, the court rejected Frank's testimony as incredible:

Involvement in genocide
Frank's lawyer claimed Frank "did not work for the political aims of National Socialism." This position was rejected by the court:

In particular, Frank at his trial claimed he only became aware of the Jewish extermination program after hearing Himmler's Posen speech on 4 October 1943, a month after he had left the WVHA. By this time, the Nazis had nearly completed the mass killings of the Jews of Poland and nearby areas of Eastern Europe in what has become known as Action Reinhard, also known as Operation Reinhard and the Reinhard action.  Frank handled the huge amount of personal property that was either robbed from the Jews while they were alive or stolen from their bodies  (there were 2,000 car loads of textiles, for instance).  In his 26 September 1942 memorandum, Frank had chosen to designate this property as "Jewish concealed and stolen goods."  The court rejected Frank's claim that he couldn't have known of the source of these goods:

Frank claimed that he didn't know and had no reason to know that the people from whom the property had come from had been murdered en masse; he testified that he thought all the property accumulating from Operation Reinhard had come from Jews who had died naturally in concentration camps.  The court rejected this contention, relying again on the categories of property Frank had dealt with in his 26 September 1942 memorandum :

Acquitted of mass murder
Although the court had ruled that Frank was criminally answerable for the slave labor program and the looting of Jewish property, he escaped criminal liability for the murders themselves, as the court viewed him as generally being only involved after the people had already been murdered.

Member of criminal organization (Nazi SS)
Frank was found guilty also of being a member of a criminal organization, that is, the Nazi SS.  Frank's highest rank in the SS was Lieutenant General (Obergruppenführer).

Sentence and commutation
On 3 November 1947 Frank was sentenced to life in prison by the tribunal with the following words:

In 1951 Frank's sentence was commuted to 15 years. He was released from prison on 6 May 1954, and died in March 1984.

See also

August Frank memorandum
Deutsche Wirtschaftsbetriebe
List SS-Obergruppenführer

References

Further reading
 Allen, Michael Thad, The Business of Genocide: the SS, slave labor, and the concentration camps,  University of North Carolina Press, Chapel Hill, NC, 2002, 
 Arad, Yitzhak. Belzec, Sobibor, Treblinka—The Operation Reinhard Death Camps, Indiana University Press, 1999, 
 Nürnberg Military Tribunal (The "Green" Series), Trials of War Criminals before the Nürnberg Military Tribunals under Control Council Law No. 10 (digitally reproduced at the website of the Mazal Library)

1898 births
1984 deaths
Holocaust perpetrators
SS-Obergruppenführer
Nazi Party officials
Operation Reinhard
German people convicted of crimes against humanity
People convicted by the United States Nuremberg Military Tribunals
People from the Kingdom of Bavaria
German prisoners sentenced to life imprisonment
Prisoners sentenced to life imprisonment by the United States military
Waffen-SS personnel